The 2007–08 Gamma Ethniki was the 25th season since the official establishment of the third tier of Greek football in 1983. It started on September 23, 2007 and ended on June 8, 2008. Diagoras and Kavala were crowned champions in South and North Groups, respectively, thus winning promotion to Beta Ethniki. The third promotion ticket was gained by Anagennisi Karditsa, second-placed in North Group, after the win against Ilioupoli, second-placed in South, to the single play-off match which was held on June 14, 2008, at Georgios Kamaras Stadium.

Prosotsani, Polykastro, A.E. Giannena and Doxa Drama from North Group, and Thyella Patras, Messiniakos, Panegialios, Acharnaikos and Thiva from South were relegated to Delta Ethniki.

Southern Group

League table

Results

Northern Group

League table

Results

Play-off match

Top scorers

References

External links
Official Site of the League
Gamma Ethniki Statistics (in Greek)

Third level Greek football league seasons
3
Greece